Sakal, Sakali, Saklolo (Choked, Maybe, Help Me) is a 2007 Filipino romantic comedy film written and directed by Jose Javier Reyes. It is sequel to the 2006 film Kasal, Kasali, Kasalo with Judy Ann Santos and Ryan Agoncillo reprising their roles (they both remain in Ysabella until it ended on January 18, 2008, 3 weeks later). There were some scenes filmed in Spain. Santos and Agoncillo were in attendance during the California and Hawaii international premieres.

The film was released through Star Cinema on December 25, 2007, as part of the 33rd Metro Manila Film Festival.

Plot

Angie (Judy Ann Santos) and Jed (Ryan Agoncillo) are first-time parents who experience the joys and pains of raising a child. They realize that parenthood is extremely demanding and learn to sacrifice their own interests for their baby. Four years later Jed realises that he and Angie still have not been on a honeymoon he decides to take Angie to Barcelona, At first Angie protests against the honeymoon but decides to go and leaves their child with their friends Kaye and Dodie. When their mothers (Gloria Diaz and Gina Pareño) hear of the couple's departure, the grandmothers each take turns caring of the child.

After Jed and Angie return from their trip, the duo must deal with their mothers' personal issues. They realize that only after they've fulfilled their roles as children can they understand the true meaning of what it is to be a parent.

Cast and characters

Main cast

Judy Ann Santos as Angelita "Angie" Mariano-Valeriano.
Ryan Agoncillo as Jerome "Jed" Valeriano

Supporting cast
Gina Pareño as Belita
Gloria Diaz as Charito
Ariel Ureta as Carlos
Soliman Cruz as Rommell
Derek Ramsay as Ronnie
Juliana Palermo as Mariel
AJ Perez † as Otap
Timothy Chan as Rafa
Dominic Ochoa as Kenneth
Lui Villaruz as Erwin
Kat Alano as Sandra
Tuesday Vargas as Catalina
Cheena Crab as Cora
Juliana Palermo as Mariel
Byron Ortile as Kevin
Ricky Davao as Alex
Ketchup Eusebio as Dodi
Steven Fermo as Bokbok
Miles Ocampo as Jane
Dagul as Bobot
Jorge Harris Concordia as Bebot

Reception

Box office
The movie debuted number 2 at the box office grossing , on its opening day. On its 4th day of release, Sakal, Sakali, Saklolo jump to #1, overtaking Enteng Kabisote 4 at the box office, bringing the total of PHP68.3 Million. As of January 12, the film had grossed . As per announcement made by ABS-CBN's Saturday edition talk show (Entertainment Live) last January 26, 2008, the movie grossed for a total of over 150 million making it the highest-grossing movie of 2007.

Accolades

Reception
Philippine Senator Aquilino Pimentel, Jr. criticized the film, particularly the scene which smacks of an ethnic slur to non-Tagalog speaking Filipinos when the character of portrayed by Gloria Diaz exclaimed to her grandchild's nannies: "Bakit pinapalaki ninyong Bisaya ang apo ko?" (Why are you rearing my grandchild as a Visayan?) The senator, who hailed from Mindanao, demanded an apology from producer Star Cinema, claiming that it makes non-Tagalog speaking Filipinos "as if they are less Filipino than the Tagalog people". Iligan City-based Call for Justice, Inc., referred to this dialog as "a typical Imperial Manila mentality".

References

External links

2007 films
Philippine romantic comedy films
Star Cinema films
Star Cinema comedy films
Films directed by José Javier Reyes